Infield may refer to:

Baseball
 Infield fly rule 
 Infield
 Infield shift 
 Infielder 
 Infield hit

Other
 Infield House, country house near Barrow-in-Furness.